The 22615 / 16 Tirupati - Coimbatore Junction Intercity Express is an Express train belonging to Indian Railways Southern Railway zone that runs between  and  in India.

Coaches
The 22615 / 16 Tirupati - Coimbatore Junction Intercity Express has one AC chair car, eight Chair car, 14 general unreserved & two SLR (seating with luggage rake) coaches . It does not carry a pantry car coach.

As is customary with most train services in India, coach composition may be amended at the discretion of Indian Railways depending on demand.

Service

Routing

Traction
As the route is going to electrification, a  based WAP-4 electric locomotive pulls the train to its destination.

References

External links
22615 Intercity Express at India Rail Info
22616 Intercity Express at India Rail Info

Intercity Express (Indian Railways) trains
Rail transport in Tamil Nadu
Rail transport in Andhra Pradesh
Transport in Tirupati
Transport in Coimbatore